Dareda is an administrative ward and a town in the Babati Rural District of the Manyara Region of Tanzania. According to the 2002 census, the ward has a total population of 18,013.

According to the 2012 census, the ward has a population of 22,880.

Hospital
Dareda Hospital is located here. It is designated for Babati Council.

References

Babati District
Wards of Manyara Region